The Ykkönen Finnish football club's 2010 season began on 18 April 2010 and ended on 16 October 2010.

The winner team will qualify directly for promotion to Veikkausliiga, the second has to play a play-off against the 13th from Veikkausliiga to decide who plays in Veikkausliiga 2011. The bottom 3 teams will qualify directly for relegation to Kakkonen.

Overview

League table

Relegation play-offs
The 13th placed team of 2010 Veikkausliiga and the runners-up of the 2010 Ykkönen will compete in a two-legged play-offs for one spot in the 2011 Veikkausliiga. JJK won the playoffs by 3-1 and remained again in Veikkausliiga.

Statistics

Top goalscorers
Source: miestenykkonen.fi 
16 goals
  Irakli Sirbiladze (KPV)

13 goals
  Nchimunya Mweetwa (RoPS)
  Fidan Seferi (FC Espoo)

11 goals
  Olli Lehtimäki (FC Hämeenlinna)

10 goals
  Pavle Khorguashvili (RoPS)
  Samu-Petteri Mäkelä (PoPa)

9 goals
  Chileshe Chibwe (RoPS)
  Eero Peltonen (Viikingit)
  Denis Santos (PS Kemi)

References

 Official site 

Ykkönen seasons
2010 in Finnish football leagues
Fin
Fin